A mallet finger, also known as hammer finger or PLF finger or Hannan finger, is an extensor tendon injury at the farthest away finger joint. This results in the inability to extend the finger tip without pushing it. There is generally pain and bruising at the back side of the farthest away finger joint.

A mallet finger usually results from overbending of the finger tip. Typically this occurs when a ball hits an outstretched finger and jams it. This results in either a tear of the tendon or the tendon pulling off a bit of bone. The diagnosis is generally based on symptoms and supported by X-rays.

Treatment is generally with a splint that holds the fingertip straight continuously for 8 weeks. The middle joint is allowed to move. This should be begun within a week of the injury. If the finger is bent during these weeks, healing may take longer. If a large piece of bone has been torn off surgery may be recommended. Without proper treatment a permanent deformity of the finger may occur.

Diagnosis
The diagnosis is generally based on symptoms and supported by X-rays.  The injury can be accompanied by swelling and ecchymosis.

Treatment
The management goal is to restore extension of the joint. Treatment is generally with a splint that holds the first joint of the finger straight continuously for 8 weeks. This should begin within a week of the injury. The splint may be worn just at night for a few additional weeks after this.  The splint acts to immobilize flexing of the joint.  

Surgery generally does not improve outcomes. It may be required if the finger cannot be straightened by pushing on it or the break has pulled off more than 30% of the joint surface. Surgery may be preferred over the use of a split if a child is non-compliant. If the problem has been present a long time surgery may also be required. An open fracture may be another reason. Surgery will put the finger in a neutral position and drill a wire through the distal interphalangeal joint (DIP) to the proximal interphalangeal joint (PIP), forcing immobilization.

See also 

 Busch fracture
 Jersey finger

References

Fingers
Injuries of wrist and hand
Musculoskeletal disorders
Wikipedia medicine articles ready to translate